Dittert is a surname. Notable people with the surname include:

 Annette Dittert (born 1962), German author, filmmaker, correspondent, and journalist
 Bernd Dittert (born 1961), German cyclist

See also
 Ditter
 Vittert